Tolulope Abraham Adesina (Tolu) is a Nigerian singer, songwriter, recording artist, music producer, and actor born in Kaduna, Northern Nigeria. He was a finalist at the 2010 MTN Project Fame.

Early life
Adesina was born into a Baptist family in Barnawa, Kaduna, and grew up as a church boy. He joined the church choir at 11 where he gained most of his musical exposure. His girl-like soprano vocals always stand him out. Growing up, he was fascinated with legends of music like Michael Jackson, Boyz II Men, R Kelly, Joe, New Edition, 112, Whitney Houston and Brandy.

Education and Music Career
Adesina studied architecture at Kaduna Polytechnic. His foray into professional music started when he auditioned for West African Idols in 2008. He also auditioned for BET’s Sunday’s Best in 2009 anchored by American Gospel Singer Kirk Franklin and was the only finalist from Nigeria that year. His breakthrough came in 2010 when he made it to the MTN Project Fame finals as one of the six winners in Season 3. That year, he released his debut single Arewa which received massive airplay in Nigeria. After Project Fame, he moved to Lagos, Nigeria where he met CEO of Mavin Records, Don Jazzy. That year, Adesina worked with Don Jazzy to produce "My lover". He also recorded another single, "Ife Mi", produced by Kaduna-born music producer Baby Fresh. In 2015, Adesina teamed up with Tiwa Savage to record a version of "Silent Night". He landed his first television role in MTV's Shuga Season 5. Adesina has also recorded several gospel songs including "I’m a star", "Holies of Holies", "Lala", and "I'm Here".

Discography

Singles
Arewa - 2010
Iam3hree EP - 2011
Shakara
gets me up
Whine it - 2012
My lover ft Donjazzy - 2014
Jemappelle Tolu - 2014
Arewa (beautiful) ft Dj soupamodel -2014
Ifemi ft Donjazzy - 2015 
3sum EP - 2016 
Newtinz
Newtinz
Prettymama 
champion ft Cdq
Shuga Rush - 2017 
Oshe Baba - 2018 
Lala - 2018 
Adaba - 2018 
I’m Here - 2018
 Nothing Without You ft Nikki Laoye - 2018

References

21st-century Nigerian male singers
Living people
People from Kaduna
Year of birth missing (living people)